Hugo Ricardo Talavera Valdez (born 31 October 1949 in Asunción, Paraguay) is a former football midfielder and forward.

Career
Talavera started his career at Nacional of Barrio Obrero before moving to Club Guaraní, where he played briefly. His career advanced in 1971, when he joined Cerro Porteño and won three national championships in a row. In 1975, Talavera moved to rival club Olimpia, where he became a key player by winning several national and international titles until 1985, the year of his retirement. In 1979 He was champion of the Copa Libertadores and the Intercontinental Cup. He also played for the Argentine club Newell's Old Boys.

At the national team level, Talavera was part of the Paraguay squad that won the 1979 Copa América tournament. That year Talavera won everything at the club level and at the national team level, being captain and figure.

After retiring from football, he briefly acted as Olimpia's head coach in 2005.

Honours

Club
  Cerro Porteño
 Paraguayan Primera División: 1972, 1973, and 1974
  Olimpia
 Paraguayan Primera División: 1978, 1979,1980, 1981, 1982, 1983, and 1985
 Copa Libertadores: 1979
 Copa Interamericana: 1979
 Intercontinental Cup: 1979

National Team
 
 Copa América: 1979

References

External links
Olimpia Website

Paraguayan footballers
Paraguayan football managers
Cerro Porteño players
Club Olimpia footballers
Club Guaraní players
Newell's Old Boys footballers
Expatriate footballers in Argentina
Living people
1949 births
Paraguay international footballers
Paraguayan expatriate footballers
Sportspeople from Asunción
1975 Copa América players
1979 Copa América players
Copa América-winning players
Copa Libertadores-winning players
Association football forwards
Association football midfielders